El Apóstol (English: The Apostle) is a 1917 lost Argentine animated film using cutout animation. Italian-Argentine immigrants Quirino Cristiani and Federico Valle directed and produced, respectively. Historians consider it the world's first animated feature film. The film began production after the success of Cristiani and Valle's short film, La intervención a la provincia de Buenos Aires, and was produced in less than ten months or in twelve months; accounts differ.

El Apóstol is a satire based on Argentina's president at the time, Hipólito Yrigoyen. In the film, Yrigoyen dreams about going to Mount Olympus and discussing politics with the gods before using one of Zeus's lightning bolts to cleanse Buenos Aires of corruption. Well-received at the time in Buenos Aires, it was not distributed in other Argentine provinces or other countries. The film was destroyed in a 1926 fire in Valle's studio.

Plot
Argentine president Hipólito Yrigoyen dreams about ascending to Olympus dressed as an apostle. He speaks with the gods about the deeds and misdeeds of the porteños, and how they laugh at him and every political program he sets up. A few congressmen appear, and express their positions. Yrigoyen discusses the level of chaos in the capital administration with the gods, and the government's financial situation. After the discussion, Yrigoyen asks Zeus for lightning bolts to cleanse Buenos Aires of immorality and corruption. Zeus grants his request; lightning bolts consume the city's main buildings, and Yrigoyen awakens.

Production

Background
Valle was an industrial-film producer who produced a newsreel, Acutalidades Valle. He hired Quirino Cristiani, known at the time for caricatures in daily newspapers, to help animate an experimental political vignette for Valle's newsreel. They made La intervención a la provincia de Buenos Aires (English: Intervention in the Province of Bueno Aires), a one-minute sketch ridiculing governor Marcelino Ugarte. The film used paper-cut animation which Cristiani learned from a film by Émile Cohl. Although many Argentine sources identify the release of La intervención a la provincia de Buenos Aires as 1916, its actual release date is unknown. The film was a success.

Writing and animation
After the success of La intervención a la provincia de Buenos Aires in 1916, Valle began working on a full-length political satire film which became El Apóstol. El Apóstol was a satire based on President Yrigoyen. Valle hired Alfonso de Laferrére to write the script, and Andrés Ducaus to build 3D models of buildings in Buenos Aires. Laferrere asked Cristiani if he would be interested in being the principal animator (equivalent to directing); Cristiani said yes, but he would need help due to the amount of work required. The animation method would be identical to that of La intervención a la provincia de Buenos Aires.

To attract publicity, Valle hired the popular cartoonist Diógenes "El Mono" Taborda. Taborda liked the idea of bringing his caricatures to life, and gave Cristiani sketches of the characters. Cristiani was dismayed, however; although he thought they were good, they were too rigid and detailed for him to animate. Toborda left the production, daunted by the amount of work needed to complete the film, but allowed Cristiani to make his drawings simpler and easier to animate. It is unknown how long El Apóstol took to produce, but it was quick for an animated film; production was estimated at less than ten months, or twelve months. A total of 58,000 frames were filmed, which clocked in at one hour and ten minutes.

Release and reception
El Apóstol was released on November 9, 1917, at the Cine Select-Suipacha. The film was successful in Buenos Aires, with many newspapers favorably reviewing the film. The destruction of Buenos Aires near the end of the film was considered its most impressive scene. It was so successful that it was shown several times daily for six months before it was banned by the Buenos Aires town council as a caricature of the current political situation. Because it appealed primarily to Buenos Aires residents, it was not distributed elsewhere in Argentina or abroad. As a result, it was not well-known at the time.

Legacy
El Apóstol became known as the first animated feature-length film. Quirino Cristiani reportedly received little credit for the film; he was paid $1,000, and received a small opening credit. Cristiani left Federico Valle due to Valle's interference with his work, and Valle never made another animated feature film. Cristiani worked on many animated short films during his career, and at least two other animated feature films: Sin dejar rastros (Without Leaving a Trace) and Peludópolis.

Sin dejar rastros was based on the sinking of an Argentine merchant ship by a German submarine which was blamed on the Allies in an attempt to get Argentina to enter World War I; however, President Yrigoyen kept the country neutral. The film was shown for one day (May 17, 1918) before it was confiscated by the Ministry of Foreign Affairs to avoid inflaming public opinion and creating more problems between Argentina and Germany, and was never seen again. Peludópolis, produced from 1928 to 1931 and the world's first animated feature-length sound film, satirized the greed of Yrigoyen and his ministers. The film, about a group of pirates led by El Peludo who hijack a ship and sail it to Republica Quesolandia (the Republic of Cheeseland), had a troubled production history due to its political content (necessitating a new ending). Released on September 16 (or 18), 1931, it was not well-received as the Great Depression struck Argentina. Cristiani withdrew Peludópolis from circulation in 1933, after Yriyogen's death, and retired from the animation industry in 1941.

A 1926 fire destroyed Valle's film studio, including his equipment and the only known copy of El Apóstol. It is now considered a lost film. Cristiani's studio burned down twice (in 1958 and 1961), and most of his work is currently lost. The only surviving animated film on which Cristiani worked is El Mono relojero, which used cels and did not reflect most of his other work. Available information about El Apóstol comes from Argentine film records, the Cristiani family archives, and Cristiani's memories as recorded by Giannalberto Bendazzi.

See also
Lists of animated feature films
List of lost films

References

Sources

External links 
 
 
El Apostol at SilentEra

1917 films
1917 animated films
1917 lost films
1910s stop-motion animated films
1910s political films
Animated feature films
Argentine animated films
Argentine silent films
Argentine black-and-white films
Argentine satirical films
Political satire films
Cutout animation films
Films about fires
Films about presidents
Cultural depictions of politicians
Cultural depictions of Argentine men
Animation based on real people
Animated films based on classical mythology
Films directed by Quirino Cristiani
Films set in Buenos Aires
Films set in heaven
Lost animated films
1910s Spanish-language films
Lost Argentine films